Cordia subcordata is a species of flowering tree in the borage family, Boraginaceae, that occurs in eastern Africa, South Asia, Southeast Asia, northern Australia and the Pacific Islands (including Hawaii).  The plant is known by a variety of names including beach cordia, sea trumpet, and kerosene wood, among others.

Names
Other names for the species include kanawa, tou, kou, mareer, manjak, snottygobbles, glueberry, narrow-leafed bird lime tree,  In Java and Madura, it is known as kalimasada, purnamasada, or pramasada; Javanese folklore consider the tree to contain spiritual power. In the Marshall Islands it is known as kono. In Fiji, it is called nawanawa.

Distribution 
This species has a very wide range from the east coast of Africa west throughout tropical Asia and Oceania, as far west as Hawaii. This distribution was achieved due to special characteristics of its fruit allowing for successful oceanic dispersal. Prior to 2001, C. subcordata was considered to be a Polynesian introduction to Hawaii by many authorities, but subfossil evidence from Makauwahi Cave in Kauai indicates that it was an abundant species in Hawaiian lowland forests well before humans arrived, confirming its status as an indigenous species.

Description

Flowers
Petals are orange and the sepals are pale green. Blooming occurs throughout the year, but most flowers are produced in the spring.

Fruit
C. subcordata produces brown fruit year round. The fruit are buoyant and may be carried long distances by ocean currents.

Habitat
It grows in areas that receive  of annual rainfall. C. subcordata prefers neutral to alkaline soils (pH of 6.1 to 7.4), such as those originating from basalt, limestone, clay, or sand. Allowable soil textures include sand, sandy loam, loam, sandy clay loam, sandy clay, clay loam, and clay. It can also grow in edges of rocky shores and mangrove swamps.

Uses
The seeds are edible and have been eaten during famine.  C. subcordata burns readily, and this led to the nickname of "Kerosene Tree" in Papua New Guinea. The wood of the tree has a specific gravity of 0.45, is soft, durable, easily worked, and resistant to termites. In ancient Hawaii kou wood was used to make umeke (bowls), utensils, and umeke lāau (large calabashes) because it did not impart a foul taste to food.  Umeke lāau were 8–16 litres (2–4 gal) and used to store and ferment poi.  The flowers were used to make lei, while a dye for kapa cloth and aho (fishing lines) was derived from the leaves. Fijians obtain fibre to make baskets and garlands from its inner bark by soaking it in seawater.

In the western Solomon Islands, in Vanuatu, on Waya Island, and in Tonga, it is used for carving. On New Ireland, its wood is always used for the ceremonial entrances to men's houses.

Threats 
Despite its very wide distribution, this species faces threats in parts of its range. During the mid-late 19th century, herbivory by the kou moth (Ethmia nigroapicella) nearly extirpated this species on the Hawaiian Islands. It is thought to be highly endangered in Sri Lanka, only persisting at a small number of sites that are under pressure from development. Logging of mature trees to create carvings for the tourism industry is also thought to be a threat throughout much of Papuasia. In addition, it may potentially be threatened by storms and sea level rise.

See also
Domesticated plants and animals of Austronesia

References

External links

 

subcordata
Plants described in 1792
Asterids of Australia
Eudicots of Western Australia
Flora of Ashmore and Cartier Islands
Flora of the Coral Sea Islands Territory
Flora of Kenya
Flora of Madagascar
Flora of Mozambique
Flora of the Northern Territory
Flora of Queensland
Flora of Somalia
Flora of Tanzania
Flora of tropical Asia
Least concern flora of Australia
Least concern biota of Queensland
Trees of Australia
Trees of the Pacific
Flora of Tonga